IndiaFilings.com is an Indian cloud-based legal and business advisory firm. It was founded in 2014 by Lionel Charles and is headquartered in Chennai, Tamil Nadu. It is incorporated under Verve Financial Services. In February 2022, ICICI Bank bought a 9.49% stake in Verve Financial Services.

IndiaFilings was established in October 2014. In April 2018, India Filings launched an online tax-payment service. In January 2022, India Filings raised funds for US$4.3 million from Mumbai-based venture capital firm Udtara Ventures, Singapore-based company B Next and Credicap Asia Dovisors. With the help of this, about seven thousand startups are added annually.

The company launched a GST portal on India Filings.com to provide education and training on the Goods and Services Tax (GST) regime in India.

IndiaFilings.com started with a small team of two employees and has since grown into a team of around 500 people.

References 

Indian websites
2014 establishments in Tamil Nadu